Svenja Stadler (born 26 August 1976) is a German politician of the Social Democratic Party (SPD) who has been serving as a member of the Bundestag from the state of Lower Saxony since 2013.

Political career 
Stadler became a member of the Bundestag in the 2013 German federal election. She is a member of the Committee for Family, Senior Citizens, Women and Youth and of the Subcommittee on Civic Involvement. An alternate member of the Budget Committee, she also serves as her parliamentary group's rapporteur on the annual budgets of the Federal Ministry of Family Affairs, Senior Citizens, Women and Youth and the Federal Ministry of Health (since 2021).

Within the SPD parliamentary group, Stadler belongs to the Parliamentary Left, a left-wing movement.

Other activities 
 German Foundation for Active Citizenship and Volunteering (DSEE), Member of the Board of Trustees (since 2020)
 Business Forum of the Social Democratic Party of Germany, Member of the Political Advisory Board (since 2020)
 Müttergenesungswerk, Chairwoman of the Board of Trustees
 German Red Cross (DRK), Member
 Lions Clubs International, Member

References

External links 

  
 Bundestag biography 

1976 births
Living people
Members of the Bundestag for Lower Saxony
Female members of the Bundestag
21st-century German women politicians
Members of the Bundestag 2021–2025
Members of the Bundestag 2017–2021
Members of the Bundestag 2013–2017
Members of the Bundestag for the Social Democratic Party of Germany